The Woodsman is a 2016 suspense film directed and written by Paul Leach as his directorial debut. Based on Little Red Riding Hood by Charles Perrault, the film stars Christopher Wolfe as a police detective Alex Whiting who must save Millie Gilson played by Sonya Krueger from a mysterious cult order.

Premise
In the small southern town of Nazareth, each month, for the last four months a girl has disappeared. They find the latest victim dead, tied to a tree, the only witness being her twelve-year-old daughter who can't remember what happened.

Cast
Christopher Wolfe as Alex Whiting
Sonya Krueger as Millie Gilson
Michael Jude Murphy as Hawes
Katie Oliver as Rachel Gilson

Reception
The film was screened at 2016 Buffalo Niagara Film Festival.

References

External links
 
 

2016 films
Films based on works by Charles Perrault
Films based on Little Red Riding Hood
2016 thriller films
American thriller films
2010s English-language films
2010s American films